Mohit Chauhan made his Bollywood debut with the Sandesh Sandilya composition "Pehli Nazar Me Dari Thi", from the film Road, which was released in 2002. Chauhan rose to prominence with the release of the song "Khoon Chala" from Rang De Basanti (2006) and "Tum Se Hi" from Jab We Met (2007). He allied with Pritam, singing one tracks for each film: Kismat Konnection, New York, and Love Aaj Kal. The duo collaborated with Emraan Hashmi, performing "Is Jahan Mein", "Pee Loon" and "Rab Ka Shukrana". Moreover, he allied with Ranbir Kapoor for "Rockstar" which was composed by A. R. Rahman. Apart from rendering "Kuchh Khaas", the year 2008 marked his first collaborations with Salim–Sulaiman and Anu Malik by singing the songs "Yaad Teri Aaye" for "Tere Bina Jee Na Lage", and "Pyar Karna Na Tha" for the latter. In 2012, Chauhan worked with Sajid–Wajid for the first time, performing a track from Ajab Gazabb Love, and in 2014 the songs "Rabba" and "Tabah".

Hindi songs

1999

2002

2003

2004

2005

2006

2007

2008

2009

2010

2011

2012

2013

2014

2015

2016

2017

2018

2019

2020

2021

2022

Upcoming(s)

Albums

1998 - 2016

2017-Present

TV Performances

TV Serials Title and Themes

Bengali songs

Telugu songs

Tamil songs

Punjabi songs

Marathi songs

Kannada songs

Gujrati songs

Himachali Songs

Jingles

Digital Concert

References

External links
 

Chauhan, Mohit